Pituntium was an Illyrian settlement of the Delmatae. The probable location is the village of Podstrana near Split and Omiš.

See also 
List of ancient cities in Illyria

References 

Former populated places in the Balkans
Cities in ancient Illyria
Illyrian Croatia
Archaeology of Illyria